William Hatfield may refer to: 

Bill Hatfield (born 1939), Australian engineer and oldest person to single-handedly sail non-stop around the world
Devil Anse Hatfield (William Anderson Hatfield, 1839–1921), patriarch of the Appalachian Hatfield clan
Hurd Hatfield (William Rukard Hurd Hatfield, 1917–1998), American actor
Sid Hatfield (William Sidney Hatfield, 1891/1893 – 1921), police chief of Matewan, West Virginia
William Hatfield (writer) (1892–1969), English-Australian writer, best known by his pen name, Ernest Chapman
William Herbert Hatfield (1882–1943), English metallurgist
Will Hatfield (William Henry Hatfield, born 1991), English footballer
William of Hatfield (1336–1337), son of King Edward III of England